Sindiren (formerly Yenice) is a rural neighborhood (mahalle) in the District of Haymana, Ankara Province, Turkey. The town had a population of 2,127 in 2020.

The town is populated by Kurds.

References 

Populated places in Ankara Province
Kurdish settlements in Ankara Province